Nina Wengert (born 3 August 1984 in Stuttgart) is a German rower.

References 
 
 

1984 births
Living people
German female rowers
Sportspeople from Stuttgart
Olympic rowers of Germany
Rowers at the 2008 Summer Olympics
World Rowing Championships medalists for Germany
European Rowing Championships medalists
20th-century German women
21st-century German women